The phrase English Corner commonly applies to informal periods of instruction in English held at schools and colleges in China. These sessions are sometimes led by native Chinese teachers or less often by teachers who are native speakers of English. The emphasis in these sessions is on improving the oral English skills of the participants. Often the activities in primary and secondary schools focus on cultural activities such as Halloween, Thanksgiving and Christmas among other festivals and holidays common in English speaking countries. As an informal session the topics can be far ranging. Usually English Corner activities are held on Friday afternoons after lunch in many schools.

The English Corner is also a specific location within the Renmin University campus in Beijing, China. Students and citizens gather here every Friday evening to speak English. It is located just west of the East Gate and "motto" rock of the university, and looks like an empty public square bordered by trees and grass. There are no signs marking it as the English Corner.

An English Corner is also held in a few other large cities in China. Shanghai in People's Park Sunday about 10 am to 5 pm; Nanjing at Gulou Square Saturday evening 7 to 10 pm; Nanning at Minzu Square across Minzu Ave from the Guangxi Great Hall of the People, Sunday mornings until noon; and Jinan at Black Tiger Spring on Sunday mornings.

Renmin University of China
English language
Education in China